Njoro is a constituency in Kenya. It is one of eleven constituencies in Nakuru County.

References 

Constituencies in Nakuru County